2010 Lahore bombing may refer to:
 March 2010 Lahore bombings
 2010 Ahmadiyya mosques massacre
 July 2010 Lahore bombings
 September 2010 Lahore bombings